The 2021 Menpora Cup was a pre-season tournament held by the PSSI ahead of the 2021 Liga 1. The tournament started on 21 March and finished with a two-legged final on 22 and 25 April 2021. Due to the COVID-19 pandemic, all matches were played behind closed doors. The 2021 edition was the second edition of Menpora Cup, with the first edition being held in 2013 which was won by Arema who defeated Australian side Central Coast Mariners by 2–1 in the final.

Persija won the finals 4–1 on aggregate against Persib for the title.

Teams
PT Liga Indonesia Baru (LIB) decided that only 18 teams that participated in the 2020 Liga 1 could join this tournament. Previously, two Liga 2 teams, PSMS and Sriwijaya, were invited. However, their participation was canceled after PT LIB held a virtual meeting. Persipura decided not to take part in the tournament which led to only 17 teams participating.

Draw
The draw of the tournament was held on 8 March 2021. Eighteen teams were divided into four groups, the first two groups contain five teams, while the rest contain only four teams. Four teams, Persija, Persib, Arema, and Persebaya, were distributed to separate groups to ensure they do not meet each other in order to mitigate security risks from travelling fans of these rivalling teams. The draw resulted in the following groups:

Venues
Four venues in four cities on Java Island were selected for the tournament.

Regulations
The regulations were as follows:
 Each team might register 30 players and did not require bringing all players to the stadium.
 Teams must register three goalkeepers.
 Player registration started on 9 March 2021 until one day before of each group's first match.
 Each team allowed to register four foreign players, including one slot for a player from AFC countries.
 Teams could only register a maximum of 10 officials with eight people allowed to sit on the bench.
 Each match was held for 90 minutes by adding a cooling break in the 30th and 75th minutes. The duration of the cooling break was 3 minutes and would be added to the extra time at the end of each round.
 Each team was allowed to substitute a maximum of six players on three occasions.
 There were additional substitutions when entering the knock-out stage. When the match was drawn for up to 90 minutes, then in the extra round, each team was allowed to add one substitution.

Group stage
The top two teams of each group advanced to the quarter-finals.

All times were local, WIB (UTC+7).

Group A

Group B

Group C

Group D

Knockout stage
In the quarter-finals, extra time would not be played, and a match would go straight to a penalty shoot-out to determine the winner. In the semi-finals and finals, the away goals rule would not be applied, and a penalty shoot-out would be used if necessary (no extra time was also played).

All times were local, WIB (UTC+7).

Bracket

Quarter-finals

Semi-finals

0–0 on aggregate. Persija won 4–3 on penalties.

Persib won 3–2 on aggregate.

Third place

Finals

Persija won 4–1 on aggregate.

Goalscorers

Awards 
 Best referee was awarded to Agus Fauzan Arifin.
 Top scorer was awarded to Assanur Rijal (Persiraja) with four goals.
 Best young player was awarded to Pratama Arhan (PSIS).
 Best player was awarded to Marc Klok (Persija).
 Fair play team was awarded to PSM.
 Best XI were as follows:

Tournament team rankings
As per statistical convention in football, matches decided in extra time were counted as wins and losses, while matches decided by penalty shoot-outs were counted as draws.

References

Piala Menpora
Piala Menpora
March 2021 sports events in Indonesia
April 2021 sports events in Indonesia